"Wheel of Fortune" is a popular song written by Bennie Benjamin and George David Weiss and published in 1951.  It is best remembered in the 1952 hit version by Kay Starr.

The song was originally recorded in 1951, for RCA Victor by Johnny Hartman, and about the same time for Crescendo Records by Al Costello with the Walter Scott Orchestra.  Several hit versions of "Wheel of Fortune" were released in 1952.  The first chart hit was by the Eddie Wilcox Orchestra featuring Sunny Gale, whose version reached number 2 on the R&B chart and number 13 on the pop chart.  The most successful version was by Kay Starr, whose recording reached number 1 in the US pop chart in March 1952, staying there for ten weeks.  Other hit versions in 1952 came from Dinah Washington (number 3, R&B), Bobby Wayne (number 6, pop), The Cardinals (number 6, R&B), and The Bell Sisters (number 10, pop).

The song was also used as the theme to the television series Wheel of Fortune.

Recorded versions

The Barry Sisters (recorded in Yiddish, released by RCA Victor as catalog number 25-5112, with the flip side "Channah From Havana")
The Bell Sisters with Henri René & His Orchestra (Recorded in Hollywood on December 18, 1951. It was released in United States by RCA Victor as catalog number 20-4520, with the flip side "Poor Whip-Poor-Will", also released in Great Britain by EMI on the His Master's Voice label as catalog number B 10232)
The Cardinals (recorded October 6, 1951, released by Atlantic Records as catalog number 958, with the flip side "Shouldn't I Know?")
Ronnie Dove recorded the song as an album track for his Cry LP in 1967.
Frankie Carle (released by RCA Victor as catalog number 20-4540, with the flip side "Be My Life's Companion")
The Four Flames (recorded December 1951, released by Specialty Records as catalog number 423, with the flip side "Later")
Ginny and the Gallions (released 1963 by Downey Records as catalog number 112, with the flip side "Hava Nagila"
Johnny Hartman (released by RCA Victor as catalog number 20-4349, with the flip side "I'm Afraid")
Helen Humes and Gerald Wiggins (recorded January 14, 1952, released by Decca Records as catalog number 48280, with the flip side "All Night Long")
Sammy Kaye's Orchestra (recorded January 1952, released by Columbia Records as catalog number 39667, with the flip side "Goodbye Sweetheart")
Maurice King's Wolverines (recorded 1952, released by OKeh Records as catalog number 6868, with the flip side "Bermuda")
The Knightsbridge Strings (released 1959 by Top Rank Records as catalog number 2014, with the flip side "Cow Cow Boogie"
Skeets McDonald (released by Capitol Records as catalog number 1993, with the flip side "Love that Haunts Me So")
Arthur Prysock (released by Decca Records as catalog number 27967, with the flip side "Till All the Stars Fall in the Ocean")
Susan Raye (released by Capitol Records as catalog number 3438, with the flip side "My Heart Skips a Beat")
Kay Starr (released by Capitol Records as catalog numbers 1677, with the flip side "Angry", and 1964, with the flip side "I Wanna Love You"; first reached the Billboard Best Seller chart on February 8, 1952 and lasted 22 weeks on the chart, peaking at number one).
Jimmy Thomason (recorded February 1952, released by King Records as catalog number 1051, with the flip side "Kiamish Choctaw Rose")
Dinah Washington (recorded January 1952, released by Mercury Records as catalog number 8267, with the flip side "Tell Me Why")
Bobby Wayne with Joe Reisman's orchestra (released by Mercury Records as catalog number 5779, with the flip side "If I Heard the Heart of a Clown"; first reached the Billboard Best Seller chart on February 15, 1952, and lasted 10 weeks on the chart, peaking at number 13).
Eddie Wilcox & Sunny Gale (released by Derby Records as catalog number 787, with the flip side "You Showed Me the Way"; first reached the Billboard Best Seller chart on February 1, 1952 and lasted 6 weeks on the chart, peaking at number 14)
Billy Williams Quartet (released by MGM Records as catalog number 11172, with the flip side "What Can I Say After I Say I'm Sorry?")

See also
List of number-one singles of 1952 (U.S.)

References

1952 singles
Kay Starr songs
Susan Raye songs
Number-one singles in the United States
Songs written by Bennie Benjamin
Songs written by George David Weiss
Atlantic Records singles
1951 songs
Okeh Records singles